Petter Wærness (born 23 April 1947) is a Norwegian rower. He competed in the men's coxed four event at the 1972 Summer Olympics.

References

1947 births
Living people
Norwegian male rowers
Olympic rowers of Norway
Rowers at the 1972 Summer Olympics
Sportspeople from Stavanger